Donald Friese (born 1940) is an American billionaire businessman, and the chief executive (CEO) and former owner of C.R. Laurence, a glazing supplies company.

Early life
Donald Friese was born in 1940 in York, Pennsylvania, the third of 13 children. After his high school graduation, he joined the U.S. Army in 1958, trained as a missile mechanic, and was stationed in Taiwan and Okinawa.

He served in the army for 3 years before moving to Los Angeles with $125 in his pocket to find a job.

Career
Friese started at C.R. Laurence in Los Angeles, which then had just one location, with an "entry-level job", as its sixth employee. A few years later, Bernie Harris, the owner, sold him a 10% stake, and he gradually acquired more, eventually buying Harris out when he retired. When Harris retired in 1997, he bought the 50% he did not already own.

Friese expanded the business by acquiring competitors and launching a manufacturing operation. By 2015, the company manufactured more than 65,000 products for the glass industry.

In 2015, he sold the company to the Irish conglomerate CRH plc for $1.3 billion cash, retaining most of the real estate and continuing as CEO. It was reported that Friese made $885 million from the sale of the company.

Personal life
Friese has been married to Andrea for 55 years (as of 2019), and lives in Chatsworth, Los Angeles. They have a weekend house in Malibu. They have three children.

References

1940 births
American billionaires
Living people
People from Chatsworth, Los Angeles
Businesspeople from Los Angeles
People from York, Pennsylvania